Khalil Beschir (born 18 June 1983) is a Lebanese motorsport entrepreneur  and Motorsport development consultant, as well as a former racing driver.

Early years
Beschir was born in Bhersaf, Lebanon. As a child, he started to watch Formula 1 on television and quickly developed a passion for the sport – vowing to become a professional racing driver.

However, Lebanon's limited motorsport infrastructure, the lack of educational support and his own lack of financial backing forced him to save enough money for a trip to Europe, where he enrolled at a racing school in Magny Cours, France in 2001.

The learning experience only cemented his ambition, and he began to gather the sponsorship required to undertake a test programme in Formula Renault 1.6.

In 2004, he made his professional racing debut at Belgium's Circuit Zolder, finishing in the top 10 after competing against the cream of Europe's single-seater talent.

With money scarce, Beschir sold his car and began working as a race team mechanic in Belgium to gain more testing mileage and to pull together the budget for further race outings. In his third race, at Belgium's Spa-Francorchamps, a problem in qualifying relegated him to 42nd on the grid – but an outstanding comeback drive saw him climb back to sixth position, earning fastest lap in the process.

Those early performances caught the eye of acclaimed motorsport manager Rick Gorne, who offered to manage Beschir and run him in Formula 1 team BAR-Honda's Drivers' Programme. However, an ongoing lack of finance brought the curtain down on his F1 aspirations and he migrated to the nascent A1 Grand Prix series, earning the Lebanese race-seat for the 2005-06 season after a shoot-out against five other drivers.

In preparation for his A1GP debut, Khalil competed in the Italian Formula 3 Championship, finishing just outside the top 10; and in selected rounds of the European F3000 series, where he finished a creditable 13th overall despite contesting less than half the rounds.

A1 Grand Prix
In late 2005, Beschir's entry into the A1 Grand Prix seriesseries made him the first Arab driver to ever contest a round of an international single-seater world championship. That first race was inauspicious – he was rolled out of seventh position at Paddock Hill Bend when he was collected by A1 Team Italy's Enrico Toccacelo. He spent three seasons in A1GP, earning a best-ever finish of eighth place, at the Durban in 2008 which made him the first driver to score for the team. Beschir was one of only 3 drivers from A1GP to win an award in 2006; he won the award for "Most Extensive Product Testing".

Formula 1 Commentary and Analysis
Khalil began his broadcasting career in 2010, when he became Abu Dhabi TV's F1 and motorsport pundit. The broadcaster was the exclusive TV rights-holder for F1, GP2 and GP3 in 24 Arab countries.

When the broadcasting rights transferred to Arab sports network beIN Sports in 2014, Beschir was quickly rewarded with a multi-year deal as the network's F1 analyst. As a commentator, he is able to draw upon his extensive single-seater experience, taking viewers into the cockpit as the sport continues to grow in popularity across the Middle East.

In 2019, Beschir was confirmed as co-commentator and analyst for MBC Action's Formula 1 coverage in the MENA region.

Business links within motorsport
Beschir has used his personal experiences to help develop and grow interest in motorsport throughout the Arab world. He has worked with the FIA to help grow education in motorsport and develop young drivers and motorsport programs across the MENA region, where he has helped expand this national scheme into a larger, global programme.

In 2015, Beschir was listed as one of the top 100 most powerful Arabs under 40, in a report published by Arabian Business.

eSkootr Championship
In June 2020, Beschir was announced as the COO of the eSkootr Championship, a new electric micro-mobility race series that will begin in 2022. He is partnered in the venture by former Formula E champion Lucas di Grassi, Austrian former Formula 1 driver and motorsport entrepreneur Alex Wurz, and his close friend Hrag Sarkissian who is the CEO of ESC.

Racing record

3000 Pro Series

A1 Grand Prix results
(key) (Races in bold indicate pole position) (Races in italics indicate fastest lap)

External links
Official site
Career statistics at DriverDB

1983 births
Living people
Lebanese racing drivers
Belgian Formula Renault 1.6 drivers
Formula Renault Eurocup drivers
A1 Team Lebanon drivers
Carlin racing drivers
A1 Grand Prix drivers
Ombra Racing drivers